Canthonistis is a genus of moths in the family Gelechiidae.

Species
 Canthonistis amphicarpa Meyrick, 1922
 Canthonistis xestocephala Diakonoff, [1968]

References

Gelechiinae
Taxa named by Edward Meyrick
Moth genera